Allbrook is a settlement and civil parish in the Borough of Eastleigh in Hampshire, England.

Governance
Before 1974 the area formed part of the municipal borough of Eastleigh. Under local government reorganisation, a larger Borough of Eastleigh including a number of rural parishes was created. The former borough became an unparished area.

The parish was created on 1 April 2010 as Allbrook following a Community Governance Review conducted by Eastleigh Borough Council in 2009. It was renamed Allbrook and North Boyatt on 16 December 2010 

After consultation with residents the Parish name was changed to Allbrook Parish Council in 2019. This was an effort to better integrate the areas of Allbrook Village and the northern part of the Boyatt Wood estate. Before the building of the extensive housing estate in Boyatt Wood in the 1970s much of the northern part was part of the traditional Allbrook area and the designation "North Boyatt" has no historical significance.

References

Populated places in Hampshire
Civil parishes in Hampshire
Borough of Eastleigh